This is a list of countries by the number of PhD degrees awarded in 2014 as per data available with the OECD.

* indicates "Research in COUNTRY or TERRITORY" or "Universities in COUNTRY or TERRITORY" links.

References

Countries
Doctorates